Muanda Airport or Moanda Airport  is an airport serving Muanda (also spelled Moanda), an Atlantic coastal city in the Democratic Republic of the Congo.

Facilities

Southwest approach and departure are over the water.

Airlines and destinations

See also

Transport in the Democratic Republic of the Congo
List of airports in the Democratic Republic of the Congo

References

External links
Muanda Airport at OpenStreetMap

Airports in Kongo Central Province